Ruchi Sanghvi (born 20 January 1982) is an Indian computer engineer and businesswoman. She was the first female engineer hired by  Facebook. In late 2010, she quit Facebook and in 2011, she started her own company Cove, with two other co-founders. The company was sold to Dropbox in 2012 and Sanghvi joined Dropbox as VP of Operations. She left Dropbox in October 2013.

In 2016, Sanghvi established South Park Commons, a residential and professional tech space that functions similarly to a hackerspace.

Early life and education 
Sanghvi was raised in Pune, India. When she was young, she intended to join her father's business after completing her studies. Sanghvi pursued her bachelor's and master's degrees in electrical computer engineering from Carnegie Mellon University.

Career

Facebook
After graduating from Carnegie Mellon University in 2004, Sanghvi initially planned to work in New York City, but says that she was horrified by the small cubicle size. She decided instead to move to Silicon Valley where her former CMU colleague Aditya Agarwal, whom she was dating, worked. She got a job at the Oracle Corporation.

In 2005, Sanghvi and Agarwal both started working at Facebook. Sanghvi was Facebook's first female engineer.

Sanghvi was one of the main people working on the first version of Facebook's News Feed product, first launched in September 2006, and she wrote the blog post announcing its launch. The original news feed was an algorithmically generated and constantly refreshing summary of updates about the activities of one's friends. The concept was relatively new at the time, with Twitter having launched only a few months in advance.

The News Feed feature was greeted with a lot of pushback and criticism, including some that was directed personally at Sanghvi. The criticism was dealt with through the introduction of new privacy controls in terms of what personal data would appear in friends' news feeds. These privacy controls were coded in a hectic 48-hour coding session by Sanghvi and other Facebook engineers including Chris Cox and Andrew Bosworth, and announced in a contrite blog post by Facebook's principal founder Mark Zuckerberg.

In 2006, Sanghvi became the product lead for Facebook Platform.

Cove and Dropbox
In late 2010, Sanghvi left Facebook and in 2011, co-founded a stealth collaboration startup called Cove along with Aditya Agarwal. In February 2012, Dropbox, the file synchronization and backup service company, announced that it had acquired Cove and that Sanghvi and Agarwal would be joining Dropbox. Sanghvi later became the Vice President of Operations at Dropbox, managing product, marketing, communications and other functions. In October 2013, Sanghvi left Dropbox, but continued to retain an advisory role at the company.

South Park Commons
In 2015, Sanghvi founded South Park Commons (SPC), a technical community and co-working space located in the South Park neighborhood of San Francisco. The community describes itself as an "anti-incubator" and includes entrepreneurs, engineers, researchers, and others. SPC has since grown to include physical spaces in San Francisco and New York City, with over 450 active members and alumni globally. In 2018, SPC raised a $40 million seed fund backed by community members. SPC raised a second fund of $150 million in 2021. Sanghvi serves as both co-head of the SPC community and general partner in the SPC Fund.

Board memberships 
Sanghvi is an investor and adviser in a number of Silicon Valley companies. She is on the board of UCSF and was previously on Paytm's board of directors.

Philanthropy 
Sanghvi was listed as one of the founders of FWD.us, a 501(c)(4) lobbying group formed in Silicon Valley to promote immigration reform, improve education, and facilitate technological breakthroughs in the United States. The group launched on 11 April 2013.

Sanghvi's personal story was featured on the FWD.us website's "Stories" section.

In an interview with Mint in November 2013, Sanghvi described her involvement with FWD.us as follows: "Silicon Valley is a very idealistic society. So FWD.us is a mission to step down from the idealistic world and do some real work. The mission is to boost the knowledge economy. Immigration is only one part of it, the other part of it is to figure out bipartisan policies to help include STEM (Science, Technology, Engineering and Mathematics) studies in the education system. Immigration is a really hot topic and I am very satisfied with the senate Bill. I am hopeful that immigration reform will pass, even though right now Washington is divided."

Personal life
Sanghvi is married to Aditya Agarwal, who was her colleague at Carnegie Mellon University and later at Facebook, Cove, and Dropbox.

Awards and honors
Sanghvi was awarded a TechFellow "Best Engineering Leadership Award" in 2011 for her work at Facebook.

In 2018, Sanghvi was a keynote speaker for HackMIT.

References

1982 births
21st-century Indian engineers
21st-century Indian women scientists
21st-century American women
American Jains
American technology company founders
American women company founders
American company founders
American women business executives
American business executives
American women engineers
Carnegie Mellon University alumni
Computer engineers
Engineers from Maharashtra
Facebook employees
Indian women computer scientists
Indian women engineers
Living people
Scientists from Pune
Women scientists from Maharashtra
21st-century American scientists
21st-century women engineers